Splendrillia vivens is a species of sea snail, a marine gastropod mollusk in the family Drilliidae.

Description
The length of the shell attains 10 mm, its diameter 3.3 mm.

Distribution
This marine species is endemic to New Zealand and occurs off Ninety Mile Beach, North Island; also off Chatham Rise at a depth of 550 m.

References

 Powell, Arthur William Baden. The New Zealand Recent and Fossil Mollusca of the Family Turridae: With General Notes on Turrid Nomenclature and Systematics. No. 2. Unity Press limited, printers, 1942.
 Powell, A.W.B. 1979: New Zealand Mollusca: Marine, Land and Freshwater Shells, Collins, Auckland 
 Spencer, H.G., Marshall, B.A. & Willan, R.C. (2009). Checklist of New Zealand living Mollusca. pp. 196–219. in: Gordon, D.P. (ed.) New Zealand inventory of biodiversity. Volume one. Kingdom Animalia: Radiata, Lophotrochozoa, Deuterostomia. Canterbury University Press, Christchurch

External links
  Tucker, J.K. 2004 Catalog of recent and fossil turrids (Mollusca: Gastropoda). Zootaxa 682:1-1295.

vivens
Gastropods of New Zealand
Gastropods described in 1942